The ALCO RS-1 was a 4-axle diesel-electric locomotive built by Alco-GE between 1941 and 1953 and the American Locomotive Company from 1953 to 1960. ALCO subsidiary Montreal Locomotive Works built an additional three RS-1s in 1954. This model has the distinction of having the longest production run of any diesel locomotive for the North American market. The RS-1 was in production for 19 years from the first unit Rock Island #748 in March 1941 to the last unit National of Mexico #5663 in March 1960.

Design 
In 1940, the Rock Island Railroad approached ALCO about building a locomotive for both road and switching service. To meet the Rock Island's request, ALCO created the RS-1. Their new design was a hood unit, in contrast to most existing locomotive designs at the time which were predominantly carbody units. The hood unit design allowed for improved visibility, especially to the rear. Rear visibility is very important for switching, which often involves reverse movements. Unlike carbody units, hood units such as the RS-1 can be operated in reverse without much difficulty, eliminating the need to turn them around at the end of a line. For these reasons, most North American locomotives built since have followed this basic design, which is known as the road switcher.

Though the locomotive could operate in either direction, the "long" hood was officially designated as the front.

Production 
The first thirteen production locomotives were requisitioned by the US Army, as U.S. involvement in World War II began shortly after ALCO began production. The five railroads affected had to wait while replacements were manufactured. The requisitioned RS-1s were remanufactured by ALCO into six axle RSD-1s for use on the Trans-Iranian Railway to supply the Soviet Union during the war.

Variants 
RSD-1: An RS-1 with two three axle trucks instead of the normal two axle trucks. The three axle trucks allowed the locomotive to operate safely on lighter track, as its weight was more evenly distributed by the additional axles. Unlike the RSC-1, all axles were powered.

RSC-1: An RS-1 with three-axle trucks, having an A1A-A1A wheel arrangement. It was used in much the same manner as the original variant, though the axle load was distributed for operation on light rail such as are found on branch lines.

Operating History 
RS-1s were primarily operated in freight service, though in some cases they were also assigned to passenger trains. A few railroads equipped their RS-1s with steam heading equipment for passenger trains. Many RS-1s were stationed in train yards for switching duties, assembling and taking apart trains to be hauled by mainline locomotives. True to their designation as 'road switchers', RS-1s could also be frequently found hauling mainline trains, especially on branch lines.

The RS-1 enjoyed a long service life, despite its manufacturer ALCO shutting down in 1969, just 9 years after the last locomotive was produced. Despite ALCO's closure, spare parts have been produced and marketed by other manufacturers for the RS-1 and other ALCO products. Many served for decades, and even in the 21st century a number of examples can still be found in freight service on shortline railroads, or on excursion trains at railroad museums.

Successors 
The RS-1 was succeeded by two improved versions in ALCO's catalogue, the RS-2 and RS-3. Despite this, the RS-1 remained in production even after both of its successors were discontinued.

Original Owners

First Thirteen

Remainder of production

Preservation

Several examples exist at tourist railways and railway museums, including:

 Boone & Scenic Valley Railroad's RS-1 purchased in 1951 by the Lake Superior and Ishpeming Railroad as #1002, sold to the Calumet & Hecla Railroad in 1967 as #205. Later purchased by Continental Grain Company, Marshalltown, IA circa 1975. Donated to the Iowa Railroad Historical Society, Boone & Scenic Valley Railroad in 1996, painted and lettered as Minneapolis and St. Louis Railway #244.
 Consumers Power (CPOX) 401 1951 built RS-1 #79350 former Rutland 401 spent her final years of service switching coal cars at Consumers Energy's  Essexville, MI power plant on the Saginaw River the unit is now at the Saginaw Railway Museum.
 Grand Trunk Western 1951 (last domestic RS-1 produced serial number 82356) at the Illinois Railway Museum
 Chicago, Rock Island & Pacific 745 (believed to be the oldest existing RS-1, and one of the replacements for the 13 taken by the U.S. Army) at the Louisiana Steam Train Association yard in Jefferson, LA
 Eastman Kodak Company 9 (built as Chicago & Western Indiana 260, sold to Genesee & Wyoming in 1971 and then to EKC) is preserved at the Rochester & Genesee Valley Railroad Museum.
 Livonia Avon & Lakeville 20 (built as Lake Erie, Franklin & Clarion 20, sold to Livonia Avon & Lakeville) is preserved at the Rochester & Genesee Valley Railroad Museum.
 Green Mountain Railroad 405 (former Rutland Railway 405, serial number 79575)
 Catskill Mountain Railroad #400 (out of service & under repair) and #401 (operating) tourist train in Kingston NY.
 Duluth, South Shore and Atlantic Railway #101, previously the only known locomotive existing from that railroad, is at the Lake Superior Railroad Museum and has been restored for occasional use on the North Shore Scenic Railroad.
 Algers, Winslow and Western Railway #4 - Built as Duluth, South Shore and Atlantic Railway #103, it is currently in service on the French Lick Scenic Railway, a line operated by the Indiana Railway Museum
 Ann Arbor Railroad #20 is owned by the Southern Michigan Railroad Society in Clinton, MI and on loan to Shepherd, MI Railroad Depot Museum and Display
 Ann Arbor Railroad #21 is owned by the Southern Michigan Railroad Society in Clinton, MI. #21 is set to undergo cosmetic and operational repairs and a return to operational status by the end of 2015. 
 Soo Line 350 survives on display at the Whippany Railway Museum in New Jersey as Morristown & Erie 21.
 Former Washington Terminal 57 is privately owned and in storage on the East Penn Railroad at Quakertown, Pennsylvania.
 Great Northern 182 is on display at the West Coast Railway Heritage Park in Squamish, British Columbia.
 Chicago, Rock Island & Pacific 743 is on display at the Oklahoma Railway Museum in Oklahoma City, OK.
 Two RS-1s are on display at the US Department of Energy's Hanford Site's B Reactor along with two flatcars.

See also 
 List of ALCO diesel locomotives
 List of MLW diesel locomotives

References 

Alco RS1 Study-Part I The Original Road Switcher by Don Dover Extra 2200 South Issue #57 Jul-Sep 1976 pp. 18–24.   
Alco RS1 Study-Part II The Original Road Switcher by Don Dover Extra 2200 South Issue #58 Oct-Dec 1976 pp. 18–21.  
Alco RS1 Roster Part 1 by Bob Carman and Joe Brockmeyer Extra 2200 South Issue #58 Oct-Dec 1976 pp. 22–23. 
Alco RS1 Study-Part III The Original Road Switcher by Don Dover Extra 2200 South Issue #59 Jan-Mar 1977 pp. 24–26.

External links 
Diesel Shop roster with all data from Extra 2200 South http://www.thedieselshop.us/Alco_RS1.HTML  

Diesel-electric locomotives of the United States
B-B locomotives
RS-1
RS-1
Railway locomotives introduced in 1941
Rolling stock innovations
Standard gauge locomotives of Canada
Standard gauge locomotives of the United States
Standard gauge locomotives of Mexico
Standard gauge locomotives of Saudi Arabia
5 ft 3 in gauge locomotives
Diesel-electric locomotives of Canada
Diesel-electric locomotives of Mexico
Diesel-electric locomotives of Saudi Arabia